Ben Wheelhouse (23 September 1902 – 1985) was an English footballer who played as a defender in the Football League in the 1920s and 1930s.

His clubs included Halifax Town and Rochdale.

References and Notes

Association football defenders
Burnley F.C. players
Halifax Town A.F.C. players
Rochdale A.F.C. players
English Football League players
Denaby United F.C. players
1902 births
1985 deaths
English footballers